Per Fredrik Wahlöö (5 August 1926 – 22 June 1975) – in English translations often identified as Peter Wahloo – was a Swedish author. He is perhaps best known for the collaborative work with his partner Maj Sjöwall on a series of ten novels about the exploits of Martin Beck, a police detective in Stockholm, published between 1965 and 1975. In 1971, The Laughing Policeman (a translation of Den skrattande polisen, originally published in 1968) won an Edgar Award from the Mystery Writers of America for Best Novel. Wahlöö and Sjöwall also wrote novels separately.

Wahlöö was born in Tölö parish, Kungsbacka Municipality, Halland. Following school, he worked as a crime reporter from 1946 onwards. After long trips around the world he returned to Sweden and started working as a journalist again.

He had a thirteen-year relationship with Sjöwall but they never married, as he already was married. Both were Marxists.

Biography 
Wahlöö's career in journalism started in 1947 in Sydsvenskan in Malmö and continued in 1949 at the new Evening Post, where he was a permanent employee, to 1953. He moved onto freelance work in the 1950s, writing theater reviews and film articles for various newspapers including for the newspapers in Norrköping before moving to Stockholm. By May 1964 Per Wahlöö's journalistic path was said to be complete. Subsequently, he was involved in the New Left journal Tidsignal (Time Signal) (1965–1970) where he was part of the editorial board, among others including the writer .

A leftist tendency and a dramatically effective narrative distinguished Wahlöö's early novels about power and the right, for example A Necessary Action from 1962, which depicts Franco's Spain, and his Dictatorship series. From the mid-1960s, he wrote together with life companion Maj Sjöwall a series of detective novels with criminal investigator Martin Beck as protagonist. Several of them have been filmed, and a  Swedish TV film series began running in 1997, with Peter Haber as Martin Beck. The series was bought by the BBC in 2015, and shown in the United Kingdom with English subtitles.

Per Wahlöö died  in Malmö in 1975,  after an unsuccessful operation on the pancreas (necessitated by cancer). He is buried in the memorial garden at Malmo Sankt Pauli's central cemetery.

Bibliography
Novels written by Per Wahlöö alone (see Martin Beck for joint collaboration with Sjöwall)
The Chief (1959)
The Wind and Rain (1961)
A Necessary Action (1962)
The Assignment (1963)
No Roses Grow on Odenplan (1964)
Murder on the Thirty-First Floor (1966)
The Steel Spring (1968)
A Necessary Action (1969)
The Generals (1974)

Legacy 
He has been described as a part of "the couple who invented Nordic noir", and he is credited as one of the main inspirations for the Norwegian writer Jo Nesbø.

References

External links 
 

1926 births
1975 deaths
People from Kungsbacka Municipality
Writers from Halland
Swedish-language writers
Swedish crime fiction writers
Edgar Award winners
Marxist journalists
Deaths from cancer in Sweden
Nordic Noir writers
Swedish male novelists
20th-century Swedish journalists